Pablo Andrés Pietrobelli (born June 14, 1980 in Bahía Blanca, Buenos Aires) is an Argentine javelin thrower. He won the bronze medal for his category at the 2006 Ibero-American Championships in Ponce, Puerto Rico, with a throw of 72.50 metres. In 2007, he set both his personal best throw and a national record of 79.45 metres by winning the gold medal at the South American Grand Prix in Bogota, Colombia.

Pietrobelli represented Argentina at the 2008 Summer Olympics in Beijing, where he competed for the men's javelin throw. He placed thirty-fourth overall in the qualifying rounds, with a throw of 69.09 metres, failing to advance into the final.

Competition record

References

External links

NBC 2008 Olympics profile

Argentine male javelin throwers
Living people
Pan American Games competitors for Argentina
Athletes (track and field) at the 2007 Pan American Games
Olympic athletes of Argentina
Athletes (track and field) at the 2008 Summer Olympics
Sportspeople from Bahía Blanca
1980 births